Convallamarin is a crystalline glycoside extracted from Convallaria majalis.

References 

Cardiac glycosides
Vinylidene compounds